Brian da Rocha Araújo (born 29 April 2000) is a Portuguese professional footballer who plays as a goalkeeper for Gil Vicente.

Club career
Born in Paris of Portuguese descent, Araújo joined the academy of Gil Vicente F.C. at the age of 13. He made his Primeira Liga debut with the club on 4 January 2021, in a 0–0 home draw against Belenenses SAD.

Following Stanislav Kritsyuk's transfer to FC Zenit Saint Petersburg in September 2021, Araújo acted as backup to Žiga Frelih.

International career
Araújo represented Portugal at under-16 level. He was also picked for the under-17 side, but eventually did not appear in any matches.

References

External links

2000 births
Living people
French people of Portuguese descent
French footballers
Portuguese footballers
Footballers from Paris
Association football goalkeepers
Primeira Liga players
Gil Vicente F.C. players
Portugal youth international footballers